Shuangwang may refer to:

 Shuangwang, Bobai County (双旺镇), a township-level division of Guangxi, China
 Shuangwang, Lulong County (双望镇), a township-level division of Hebei, China